State Route 341 (SR 341) is a state highway in western Nevada connecting US 50 (US 50) near Dayton to Reno via Virginia City. Commonly known as the Virginia City Highway, or Geiger Grade north of Virginia City, the route has origins dating back to the 1860s.

Route description

From this intersection, the highway proceeds north towards its south junction with SR 342 in Silver City. From here, SR 341 veers eastward around Silver City and Gold Hill, proceeds up the Occidental Grade and bridges over the Virginia and Truckee Railroad at the site of that line's daylighted Tunnel #5 before reconnecting with SR 342 on the south side of Virginia City. The highway runs along C Street as it travels northward through Virginia City. SR 341 leaves Virginia City and travels northerly and westerly through winding sections on both sides of Geiger Summit. The highway then terminates just north of Steamboat Springs at Tahoe Junction, a major signalized intersection with South Virginia Street/Carson-Reno Highway (US 395 Alt.) and Mount Rose Highway (SR 431).

The Nevada Department of Transportation refers to the entire route (except the portion between the SR 342 junctions, which is known locally as the Occidental Grade) as the Comstock Highway.

The highway is also known as Geiger Grade between Virginia City and Tahoe Junction, though parts of its modern-day alignment deviates from the original alignment of the old stagecoach route.

History

SR 341 began as a toll facility constructed by Davison M. Geiger and John H. Tilton in 1862. Despite the dangers associated with traveling the route, Geiger Grade was a well-traveled route that provided the most direct connection between the Comstock Lode and the Reno area.

The road appears on highway maps dating back to at least 1919.  However, it wasn't until 1929 that the route first appeared as State Route 17 on official Nevada highway maps. The original road was replaced with the present-day paved highway alignment in 1936.

The highway appears to have remained largely unchanged until the 1970s. In the Nevada state highway renumbering that began in 1976, the entirety of State Route 17 was reassigned to present-day SR 341; this change first appears on the 1978-79 version of the official state map.

Major intersections
Note: Mileposts in Nevada reset at county lines. The start and end mileposts for each county are given in the county column.

See also

References

External links

 
 Nevada State Route 341 @ AARoads

341
Transportation in Lyon County, Nevada
Transportation in Storey County, Nevada
Transportation in Washoe County, Nevada
Virginia City, Nevada